Alexander McLean Davies (21 May 1920 – February 1998) was a Scottish footballer who scored nine goals from 37 appearances in the Football League playing for Lincoln City. He played as a winger. He was on the books of Sheffield Wednesday without representing them in the league, and later played for Frickley Colliery.

References

1920 births
1998 deaths
Footballers from South Ayrshire
Scottish footballers
Association football wingers
Sheffield Wednesday F.C. players
Lincoln City F.C. players
Kiveton Park F.C. players
Frickley Athletic F.C. players
English Football League players